In Ontario, a Public Health Unit (PHU) is a government organization under the supervision of a local board of health. A PHU is under the direction of a Medical Officer of Health (MOH), who is appointed by the supervising board of health. The principle legislation governing PHUs is the Health Protection and Promotion Act.

A Public Health Unit administers health programming such as communicable disease control, food premise inspection, and health education. Funding is provided by both the province and the municipality.

List of PHUs 
 Algoma Public Health Unit, Sault Ste. Marie
 Brant County Health Unit, Brantford
 Chatham-Kent Health Unit, Chatham
 Durham Region Health Department, Whitby
 Eastern Ontario Health Unit, Cornwall
 Grey Bruce Health Unit, Owen Sound
 Haldimand-Norfolk Health Unit, Simcoe
 Haliburton, Kawartha, Pine Ridge District Health Unit, Port Hope
 Halton Region Health Department, Oakville
 Hamilton Public Health Services, Hamilton
 Hastings and Prince Edward Counties Health Unit, Belleville
 Huron Perth District Health Unit, Stratford
 Kingston, Frontenac and Lennox & Addington Public Health, Kingston
 Lambton Public Health, Point Edward
 Leeds, Grenville and Lanark District Health Unit, Brockville
 Middlesex-London Health Unit, London
 Niagara Region Public Health Department, Thorold
 North Bay Parry Sound District Health Unit, North Bay
 Northwestern Health Unit, Kenora
 Ottawa Public Health, Ottawa
 Peel Public Health, Mississauga
 Peterborough Public Health, Peterborough
 Porcupine Health Unit, Timmins
 Renfrew County and District Health Unit, Pembroke
 Simcoe Muskoka District Health Unit, Barrie
 Southwestern Public Health, St. Thomas
 Sudbury & District Health Unit, Sudbury
 Thunder Bay District Health Unit, Thunder Bay
 Timiskaming Health Unit, New Liskeard
 Toronto Public Health, Toronto
 Region of Waterloo, Public Health, Waterloo
 Wellington-Dufferin-Guelph Public Health, Guelph
 Windsor-Essex County Health Unit, Windsor
 York Region Public Health Services, Newmarket

History 

Health units previously were at the municipal level, meaning that small villages or lowly-populated townships would have their own health programs. As of 1931, Ontario had 944 Medical Officers of Health, of which only 12 were full-time. Advocates for amalgamation included Dr. John Morrow Robb, the provincial Minister of Health from 1930 to 1934. He noted in 1931 that by banding together, municipalities could hire someone full-time.

This sort of call continued for decades, with the Lakeshore Board of Education in 1956 asking the councils of the Town of Mimico, Town of New Toronto, and Village of Long Branch to consider forming one central service. In 1960, the Toronto Board of Health chair called for a Metro-wide board, stating "epidemics don't recognize municipal boundaries. The present chaotic division of health responsibilities in ridiculous." Such moves were opposed as of 1967, with Metro's six mayors claiming that one body couldn't serve 2 million residents. One chair suggested that a merger would lead to a "lowest common denominator" approach.

References

External links 
 Government of Ontario webpage
Ministry of Health Public Health Unit locator

Health in Ontario
Medical and health organizations based in Ontario
Public health organizations